Christian Ariel Cellay (born September 5, 1981) is an Argentine football defender who plays for UE Sant Julià in Andorra, as centre back or right back too.

Career
Cellay started his professional career with Huracán where he made 147 league appearances. He transferred to Estudiantes de La Plata in 2008. In 2009, he won the 2009 Copa Libertadores championship with Estudiantes.

In June 2010, Cellay was bought by Boca Juniors for US$2 million fee, plus the loan of Facundo Roncaglia.

On 29 January 2014, was reported that Cellay joined Primera División club Rangers of Chile. However, he failed to continue at Maule Region team after their relegation to second-tier and was linked with a move to Paraguayan sides of Olimpia and Sol de América.

After playing in Ecuador for a season in the Mushuc Runa club Cellay moved to the second tier of the Argentinean football system as player of Gimnasia de Jujuy. Christian Cellay signed in 2017 by UE Sant Julià of Andorra in the European football.

International appearances and goals

Honours

Club
Huracán
 Primera B Nacional (1): 1999–00
Estudiantes de La Plata
 Copa Libertadores (1): 2009
Boca Juniors
 Torneo Apertura (1): 2011
 Copa Argentina (1): 2012

References

External links
 Argentine Primera statistics  
 
 
 Christian Cellay at Historia de Boca.com 
 Christian Cellay at La Preferente

1981 births
Living people
Footballers from Buenos Aires
Association football defenders
Argentine footballers
Argentine expatriate footballers
Argentina international footballers
Estudiantes de La Plata footballers
Club Atlético Huracán footballers
Boca Juniors footballers
Rangers de Talca footballers
Mushuc Runa S.C. footballers
Gimnasia y Esgrima de Jujuy footballers
UE Engordany players
UE Sant Julià players
Chilean Primera División players
Argentine Primera División players
Primera Divisió players
Ecuadorian Serie A players
Argentine expatriate sportspeople in Chile
Argentine expatriate sportspeople in Ecuador
Argentine expatriate sportspeople in Andorra
Expatriate footballers in Chile
Expatriate footballers in Ecuador
Expatriate footballers in Andorra